Sultan Haydar (born May 23, 1985 in Golerogi, Ethiopia) is an Ethiopian-born Turkish long-distance runner.

Born Chaltu Girma Meshesha in Ethiopia, she started off her career as a middle distance runner and was the bronze medalist in the 800 metres at the 2005 African Junior Athletics Championships. Her final international appearance for Ethiopia came at the 2006 African Championships in Athletics, where she showed a talent for racewalking as she came sixth in the women's 20 km walk. She transferred her eligibility to Turkey in 2008.

Haydar's first competition for Turkey was the 2008 European Cross Country Championships. She started the women's under-23 race quickly but yielded her early lead and dropped out at the halfway point. She was the 1500 metres gold medalist at the 2009 European Athletics U23 Championships, then won the under-23 race at the 2009 European Cross Country Championships later that year. At the beginning of 2011 she made her debut over the half marathon and recorded a time of 1:10:02 hours for  seventh place at the high calibre RAK Half Marathon. She ran in the 1500 m at the 2010 European Athletics Championships, but failed to finish her heat. She turned to the 3000 metres at the 2011 European Athletics Indoor Championships, where she set a personal best of 9:03.50 minutes to win her heat, but was slower in the final, coming in ninth place. Outdoors, she competed for Turkey on home soil for the First League of the 2011 European Team Championships and won the 3000 m in a long-distance event sweep with Alemitu Bekele Degfa and Binnaz Uslu. Haydar also won the bronze in the 1500 m.

She was the leader for much of the 2011 Istanbul Marathon, but slowed after 35 km and eventually finished seventh. The 2012 Paris Marathon saw her establish herself as a top level marathon runner. In spite of being well-beaten by winner Tirfi Tsegaye Beyene, Haydar improved her best by over ten minutes to set a Turkish national record mark of 2:25:07 hours in second place.

Sultan Haydar qualified for participation in the marathon event at the 2012 Summer Olympics but managed only 72nd place with a slow time of 2:38:26 hours. She ended the year with a third-place finish at the Istanbul Marathon. In her first marathon of 2013, she came third at the Rome City Marathon with a time of 2:27:10 hours. On November 17, 2013, Sultan Haydar repeated her third-place success at the Istanbul Marathon finishing with 2.29.40 after her countrywoman Elvan Abeylegesse.

Achievements

References

External links

1985 births
Living people
Ethiopian female marathon runners
Turkish female middle-distance runners
Turkish female long-distance runners
Ethiopian female middle-distance runners
Ethiopian female long-distance runners
Turkish people of Ethiopian descent
Naturalized citizens of Turkey
Ethiopian emigrants to Turkey
Enkaspor athletes
Olympic athletes of Turkey
Athletes (track and field) at the 2012 Summer Olympics
Turkish female marathon runners
World Athletics Championships athletes for Turkey
European champions for Turkey
Athletes (track and field) at the 2016 Summer Olympics
Athletes (track and field) at the 2013 Mediterranean Games
Mediterranean Games competitors for Turkey